Haryana Orbital Rail Corridor (HORC), with target completion by 31 March 2025, is an under construction twin-track -km long Indian gauge railway project in Haryana state of India, which will run around along the Western Peripheral Expressway (WPE) on the western side of Delhi. 

The railway line will connect Palwal to Sonipat via Sohna, Manesar and Kharkhoda. At Palwal, Patli (Delhi–Rewari line), Sultanpur (Garhi Harsaru–Farukhnagar line), Asaudha (Delhi–Rohtak line) and Harsana Kalan (Delhi-Ambala line) railway stations, it will connect to existing railway lines running radially from Delhi. It will also connect to the Western Dedicated Freight Corridor (WDFC) at Prithala near Palwal railway station. Once completed, it will transport 20,000 passengers a day and 50 MTPA cargo.

The Haryana Rail Infrastructure Development Corporation (HRIDC), a joint venture founded by the Ministry of Railways and Government of Haryana - Haryana State Industrial and Infrastructure Development Corporation (HSIIDC), will construct the corridor by 2025. The Cabinet Committee on Economic Affairs of Government of India approved  for the project in September 2020.

Aravali tunnel
 

Haryana Orbital Railway Aravali Tunnel (HORA Tunnel), 4.69 km long railway tunnel parallel to the Western Peripheral Expressway, through aravali mountain range is the only tunnel on is this route. Tender were invited in July 2022 and finalised in December 2022, subsequently construction will be completed in 30 months by 31 June 2024.

Additional connectivity 

Haryana Orbital Rail Corridor will enhance connectivity with and among the following:

Expressways

The rail corridor will run within Haryana along the Western Peripheral Expressway (WPE), connecting various hubs along the way. WPE is connected to Eastern Peripheral Expressway (EPE) which runs in Uttar Pradesh, It will also pass across Delhi–Mumbai Expressway between Sohna and Palwal, and Delhi–Amritsar–Katra Expressway near Kharkhoda.

DMIC and WDFC

This orbital railway will be key enabler of Delhi–Mumbai Industrial Corridor Project as it will also connect to Delhi-Mumbai Western Dedicated Freight Corridor (WDFC) near Palwal railway station. Delhi–Mumbai Expressway is also part of this corridor which will intersect the orbital railway.

Rail lines among IGI Delhi, Hisar and Noida airports 

Hisar International Airport to IGI Delhi semi-high-speed train will be introduced, which may require upgrade/replacement of existing or laying of additional new line between Hansi to Asaudha (near Bahadurgarh on Haryana Orbital Rail Corridor). This will also connect to the Delhi–Alwar Regional Rapid Transit System near Gurugram via Haryana Orbital Rail corridor.

This will also enable connectivity between Hisar Airport and Noida International Airport (Jewar Airport), and Jewar Airport to IGI Delhi.

RRTS and high-speed rail

This corridor will also intersect with Delhi–Ahmedabad high-speed rail corridor near Manesar, and various RRTS such as Delhi–Alwar RRTS, Delhi–Sonipat RRTS, Delhi-Rohtak-Hisar RRTS and Delhi-Palwal-Hodal RRTS.

Metro

This corridor will also intersect with the following proposed and/or under-construction spurs of Delhi Metro:

 Narela-Sonipat metro on Red Line
 Bahadurgarh-Rohtak metro near Asaudha on Green Line
 Gurugram-Manesarmetro at Manesar on Yellow Line
 Najafgarh-Jhajjar metro near Badli on Grey Line
 Badli-Badsa metro near AIIMS Badsa on Grey Line
 Faridabad-Palwal metro near Asaoti on Violet Line

See also 

 Administrative divisions of Haryana
 Highways in Haryana
 Railway in Haryana
 Future of rail transport in India
 National Capital Region Transport Corporation

References

External links 

 

High-speed railway lines in India
5 ft 6 in gauge railways in India
Rail transport in Haryana
Proposed railway lines in India
Modi administration initiatives
2025 in rail transport